In mathematics, Hardy's theorem is a result in complex analysis describing the behavior of holomorphic functions. 

Let  be a holomorphic function on the open ball centered at zero and radius  in the complex plane, and assume that  is not a constant function. If one defines 

 	

See also
 Maximum principle
 Hadamard three-circle theorem

References
 John B. Conway. (1978) Functions of One Complex Variable I. Springer-Verlag, New York, New York.

Theorems in complex analysis